Amitovo (Ämit) is a rural locality (a village) in Turbaslinsky Selsoviet, Iglinsky District, Bashkortostan, Russia. The population was 37 as of 2010. There is 1 street.

Geography 
Amitovo is located 40 km southwest of Iglino (the district's administrative centre) by road. Postupalovo is the nearest rural locality.

References 

Rural localities in Iglinsky District